

Abdul Aziz, (1941−17 January 1959)  was a Pakistani cricketer who was born, and died, in Karachi, Sind. A wicket-keeper and opening batsman, Aziz played eight first-class matches for Karachi before he died after being struck by a cricket ball. He was a student at S. M. College and worked for the Pakistan State Bank.

Whilst batting in the first innings of the Quaid-e-Azam final against Pakistan Combined Services, Aziz was struck over the heart by a slow off break from Dildar Awan. While preparing to receive the next ball, Aziz fell to the ground and never regained consciousness, dying en route to the hospital. It is believed the blow aggravated an existing undiagnosed heart condition. A player who does not bat in an innings is recorded in the scorecard as "absent";  Aziz is recorded as "absent" in the second innings, with a footnote explaining he was hurt but died.

Two of Aziz's brothers also played first-class cricket: Abdul Kadir played one match for North-West Frontier Province; Abdur Rasheed played 28 matches between 1953/54 and 1964/65.

See also 
 List of unusual deaths
 Ray Chapman, an American baseball player killed after being struck by a ball during a game; he was the only player in Major League Baseball history to die of an in-game injury
 List of fatal accidents in cricket

Notes

References
Haigh, Gideon ed. (2006). "Aziz, Abdul" in Peter, the Lord's Cat. London, Aurum Press.

External links

1941 births
1959 deaths
Pakistani cricketers
Karachi cricketers
Cricketers from Karachi
Karachi C cricketers
Cricket deaths
Sport deaths in Pakistan
Khyber Pakhtunkhwa cricketers